The Millionaire is a 1917 American silent comedy film featuring Oliver Hardy.

Cast
 Billy West as Billy
 Oliver Hardy as The mother-in-law (as Babe Hardy)
 Ethel Marie Burton as Ethel (as Ethel Burton)
 Joe Cohen
 Florence McLaughlin as (as Florence McLoughlin)
 Polly Bailey (as Polly Van)
 Ethelyn Gibson (as Ethlyn Gibson)
 Leo White
 June Walker
 Bud Ross (as Budd Ross)

See also
 List of American films of 1917
 Oliver Hardy filmography

External links

1917 films
1917 short films
American silent short films
American black-and-white films
Films directed by Arvid E. Gillstrom
1917 comedy films
Silent American comedy films
American comedy short films
1910s American films